Jan Henningsen (born 2 March 1954) is a former international speedway rider from Denmark.

Speedway career 
Henningsen won a bronze medal in the final of the Speedway World Pairs Championship in the 1975 Speedway World Pairs Championship.

He rode in the top tier of British Speedway from 1975-1976, riding for King's Lynn Stars.

World Final appearances

World Pairs Championship
 1975 -  Wrocław, Olympic Stadium (with Ole Olsen) - 3rd - 20pts (18)

References 

1954 births
Living people
Danish speedway riders
King's Lynn Stars riders
People from Esbjerg
Sportspeople from the Region of Southern Denmark